Anna Maria Nordqvist (born 10 June 1987) is a Swedish professional golfer who plays on the U.S.-based LPGA Tour and the Ladies European Tour. She has won three major championships: the 2009 LPGA Championship, the 2017 Evian Championship, and the 2021 Women's British Open. She is the only non-American woman to have won major championships in three different decades (2000s, 2010s and 2020s).

Amateur career
Born in Eskilstuna, Sweden, Nordqvist was a successful amateur golfer in both Europe and the United States. She was Swedish Junior Player of the Year (2004, 2005), Swedish Amateur of the Year (2005), Girls Amateur Champion (2005), bronze medallist at the European Ladies Amateur Championship (2005), runner-up at the British Ladies Amateur in 2006 and 2007, and finally winner of the championship in her third successive final in 2008. She made the cut at the Ricoh Women's British Open in both 2007 and 2008 and earned the Smyth Salver for low amateur honours in 2008.

She was part of the winning Swedish team at the 2008 European Ladies' Team Championship and was a member of the victorious Swedish team at the 2008 World Amateur Team Championships for the Espirito Santo Trophy, finishing individual runner-up to teammate Caroline Hedwall.

By the end of her freshman year at Arizona State University in 2007, she was Pac-10 co-champion and was named National Golf Coaches Association (NGCA) Freshman of the Year, Pac-10 Player of the Year and Newcomer of the Year. NGCA First-Team All-American and Academic All-American honors were gained in both 2007 and 2008. She tied for fifth at the 2008 NCAA Championships (won by ASU teammate Azahara Muñoz).

In December 2008, she tied for 25th at the LPGA Final Qualifying Tournament and turned professional immediately following the final round. In January 2009, she won the Ladies European Tour Final Qualifying School.

Professional career
In only her fifth start on the LPGA Tour, Nordqvist won her first professional tournament and major, the LPGA Championship in Maryland in June 2009. This led to her selection as a captain's pick for the Solheim Cup. In November, she won the LPGA Tour Championship for her second victory of the season. She was named Rookie of the Year on the Ladies European Tour and finished runner-up to Jiyai Shin for LPGA Rolex Rookie of the Year honors.

At the 2013 Solheim Cup, Nordqvist won her alternate shot match with Caroline Hedwall with a hole-in-one at the 17th hole, beating Morgan Pressel and Jessica Korda 2 and 1 during the Saturday morning session. This was the first hole-in-one in Solheim Cup history.

At the end of May 2015, Nordqvist won her fifth official tournament on the LPGA Tour. She birdied the second-to-last hole and bogeyed the 54th hole to win by one stroke over Dutchwoman Christel Boeljon in Galloway, New Jersey.

At the 2016 U.S. Women's Open, Nordqvist lost to Brittany Lang in a playoff due to a rules violation, for touching the sand with the club in a bunker. The rules violation occurred on the second of three playoff holes but was not disclosed to the players until mid-way through play on the third hole.

In September 2017, she won her second major, The Evian Championship in France, after overcoming American Brittany Altomare in a play-off in horrendous weather conditions.

In August 2021, she won her third major by winning the Women's British Open at Carnoustie Golf Links in Carnoustie, Scotland. For 2021, she had won only $283,715 in 14 tournaments before her $870,000 winning share from it, leaping to $1,153,715 and sixth place.

Nordqvist won the 2022 Big Green Egg Open in The Netherlands, her first individual success on the Ladies European Tour outside of the majors.

Personal life
Nordqvist lives in Scottsdale, Arizona.

Professional wins (13)

LPGA Tour wins (9)

Co-sanctioned by the Ladies European Tour.

LPGA Tour playoff record (1–1)

Ladies European Tour wins (5)

 Co-sanctioned by the LPGA Tour.

Ladies European Tour playoff record (2–2)

Other wins (1)
2010 (1) The Mojo 6 (unofficial tournament sanctioned by the LPGA Tour)

Major championships

Wins (3)

1 Defeated Brittany Altomare in a sudden-death playoff: Nordqvist (5) and Altomare (6).

Results timeline
Results not in chronological order before 2019 or in 2020.

^ The Evian Championship was added as a major in 2013

LA = Low amateur
CUT = missed the half-way cut
NT = no tournament
"T" = tied

Summary

Most consecutive cuts made – 14 (2019 British Open – 2022 Evian)
Longest streak of top-10s – 4 (2014 WPGA – 2015 WPGA)

LPGA Tour career summary

 official as of 2022 season

* Includes match play and other events without a cut

World ranking
Position in Women's World Golf Rankings at the end of each calendar year.

Team appearances
Amateur
European Girls' Team Championship (representing Sweden): 2005
Junior Solheim Cup (representing Europe): 2005
Espirito Santo Trophy (representing Sweden): 2006, 2008 (winners)
Vagliano Trophy (representing the Continent of Europe): 2007 (winners)
European Ladies' Team Championship (representing Sweden): 2007, 2008 (winners)

Professional
Solheim Cup (representing Europe): 2009, 2011 (winners), 2013 (winners), 2015, 2017, 2019 (winners), 2021 (winners)
European Nations Cup (representing Sweden): 2010 (winners), 2011 (winners)
International Crown (representing Sweden): 2014, 2018

Solheim Cup record

References

External links

Swedish female golfers
Ladies European Tour golfers
LPGA Tour golfers
Winners of ladies' major amateur golf championships
Winners of LPGA major golf championships
Solheim Cup competitors for Europe
Olympic golfers of Sweden
Golfers at the 2016 Summer Olympics
Golfers at the 2020 Summer Olympics
Arizona State Sun Devils women's golfers
Golfers from Orlando, Florida
Sportspeople from Södermanland County
People from Eskilstuna
1987 births
Living people